Kodoor River is a river between the  Kottayam and Alappuzha district of Kerala state, South India.
Kodoor River has a long history with the old trading routes between the coastal district Alapuzha and the eastern villages of Kottayam. There was a busy jetty at Puthuppally named Angadi, which means market. 
The river is originated from the beautiful hills in between Kottayam and Pathanamthitta districts and finally empty into the Meenachil River.

Rivers of Alappuzha district
Rivers of Kottayam district